The sulfate chlorides are double salts containing both sulfate (SO42–) and chloride (Cl–) anions. They are distinct from the chlorosulfates, which have a chlorine atom attached to the sulfur as the ClSO3− anion.

Many minerals in this family exist. Many are found associated with volcanoes and fumaroles. As minerals they are included in the Nickel-Strunz classification group 7.DG.

The book, Hey's Chemical Index of Minerals groups these in subgroup 12.2.

List

Artificial 

Some "chloride sulfates" are sold as solutions in water and used for water treatment. these include ferric chloride sulfate and polyaluminium sulfate chloride. The solutions may also be called "chlorosulfates" even though they do not contain a chlorosulfate group.

References 

Sulfates
Chlorides
Double salts
Mixed anion compounds